René Jutras (September 30, 1913 – December 23, 1995) was a Canadian politician.

Born in Letellier, Manitoba, the son Joseph Jutras and Clara Blais, he attended St. Boniface College and received a Bachelor of Arts degree from the University of Manitoba. During World War II, he served in the Royal Canadian Air Force. He was first elected to the House of Commons of Canada for the riding of Provencher in the 1940 federal election. A Liberal, he served until he was defeated in the 1957 election.

Electoral history

References

1913 births
1995 deaths
Members of the House of Commons of Canada from Manitoba
Liberal Party of Canada MPs
University of Manitoba alumni